Paul Sabin Nassif (born June 6, 1962) is an American plastic surgeon and television personality. He specializes in rhinoplasty. Nassif is a member of the American Society for Aesthetic Plastic Surgery.

Nassif is best known for co-hosting the E! reality series Botched with Terry Dubrow. The plastic surgery-themed show premiered on June 24, 2014 and has aired for seven seasons (as of 2022), and its spin-off series Botched by Nature, starring both Dubrow and Nassif, aired in 2016. He has also appeared on E!'s Dr. 90210, and the first three seasons of The Real Housewives of Beverly Hills, on which his ex-wife Adrienne Maloof was a main cast member.

Education
Nassif went to Loyola High School in Los Angeles, California, and the University of Southern California, graduating in 1984. He attended Rosalind Franklin University of Medicine and Science/Chicago Medical School in his first two years of medical education, and University of Southern California School of Medicine for the latter two years, graduating in 1992. He interned in general surgery residency at University of New Mexico Health Sciences Center, followed by an Otolaryngology-head and neck surgery residency at University of New Mexico from 1993 to 1997. He subsequently completed a facial plastic and reconstructive surgery fellowship at St. Louis University School of Medicine in 1998.

Personal life
Paul Nassif is of Lebanese descent. On May 2, 2002, Nassif married Adrienne Maloof, a businesswoman and member of the Maloof family. The couple have three sons: Gavin, Colin and Christian. They resided in Beverly Hills, California. Nassif filed for separation from Adrienne on July 30, 2012. Nassif's lawyer, Lisa Meyer, argued that Maloof displayed repetitive bouts of verbal and physical abuse towards him in the presence of their children. They were divorced on November 8, 2012.

On June 1, 2019 Nassif became engaged to Brittany Pattakos. On Saturday, September 28, 2019 the couple married in Santorini. Their daughter, Pauline Anne, was born on October 12, 2020.

References

External links
 
 Spalding Plastic Surgery
 

1962 births
Living people
American plastic surgeons
American otolaryngologists
People from Beverly Hills, California
Television personalities from California
Keck School of Medicine of USC alumni
California Republicans
American people of Lebanese descent
University of Southern California alumni